SHARE-Israel is the Israeli component of the Survey of Health, Ageing and Retirement in Europe, a multidisciplinary and cross-national panel database of micro data on health, socio-economic status as well as social and family networks of  individuals aged 50 or over.

About SHARE-Israel
Israel joined the SHARE framework in 2004, being the first country in the Middle East to initiate a systematic study of its aging population. SHARE-Israel encompasses two waves of data collected thus far. All SHARE data, including the Israeli component, is available to the entire research community free of charge, and can be obtained through the SHARE website  or the National Archive of Computerized Data on Aging.

SHARE-Israel is coordinated by the Israel Gerontological Data Center (IGDC), at the Hebrew University of Jerusalem. The Israel Gerontological Data Center was established with funds from the Ministry of Science and Technology, and is supported by the Ministry for Senior Citizens. SHARE-Israel is directed by Prof. Howard Litwin, with assistance from a multidisciplinary team of expert consultants from the United States, Europe and Israel.

The instrument 
The survey instrument addresses demographic details, physical health, grip strength, walking speed, behavioral risks, cognitive function, mental health, health care, employment and pensions, children, social support, financial transfers, housing, household income, consumption, assets and future expectations.  In addition, the Israeli questionnaire includes two domains not yet addressed in SHARE: 
  Measure of life-long trauma. Respondents were asked to indicate difficult life events that they experienced and the degree to which they were affected by them. Respondents also reported their personal experiences during the Holocaust.
  Examination of reactions to pension reform. This section addresses awareness of forthcoming delays in the age of eligibility for retirement pension in Israel, and respondents` preparations towards it.

Data collection
In order to obtain a representative sample of Israelis aged 50 or over, Israel's population was divided into three sections:  
 Jewish-Israelis who immigrated to Israel before 1989 or were born in Israel, and were interviewed in the Hebrew language
 Arab citizens of Israel, interviewed in the Arabic language
 Immigrants of the Russian immigration to Israel in the 1990s, interviewed in the Russian language.

Wave 1 
Executed in Israel in 2005-2006, the first wave encompassed 2,598 respondents residing in 1,771 households.

Wave 2 
Executed in Israel in 2009-2010, the second wave encompassed 2,464 respondents.

Wave 3 
Data has been collected during 2013, and the results will be published around March 2015.

Results
The Israel Gerontological Data Center holds an up-to-date list of all publications based on SHARE-Israel results.

Funding 
SHARE-Israel has been supported by:
 The National Insurance Institute of Israel
 The Ministry of Science and Technology
 The Ministry for Senior Citizens 
 The 7th Framework Programmes for Research and Technological Development of the European Union
 The US National Institute on Aging
 The German-Israeli Foundation for Scientific Research and Development

References

External links
SHARE-Israel project
Israel Gerontological Data Center
A list of publications based on SHARE-Israel
SHARE Survey of Health, Ageing and Retirement in Europe
Ruth Eglash, "Survey: Israeli men over 50 more depressed than Europeans" Jerusalem Post, Nov 13, 2007 
 COMPARE - Toolbox for Improving the Comparability of Cross-National Survey Data with Applications to SHARE

Social statistics data